The CircleRoute is a pair of circular bus routes operated by Transperth through Perth's suburbs.

History

The CircleRoute was introduced in two stages. On 16 February 1998 the first stage of the CircleRoute commenced operating between Fremantle and Oats Street stations via Murdoch station. It was operated by Swan Transit with Mercedes-Benz O305 buses in a special livery with purple bands blended into the green blocks of the standard colour scheme, with an elliptical shaped logo featuring two arrows in white.

On 22 February 1999, the route was extended to become a 133 stop, 84 kilometre circular route. All four Perth contractors; Path Transit, Perth Bus, Southern Coast Transit and Swan Transit, operated services. In December 2000, the services began operating daily with the introduction of a Sunday service.

Prior to the CircleRoute's introduction, Perth had limited cross-suburban routes, with most of the network focused on transporting people towards the Perth central business district, and to a lesser extent, regional centres such as Fremantle. Projected patronage on the CircleRoute before its introduction indicated significant patronage over most of its route, aside from the section through Belmont, which had only modest predicted patronage.

The CircleRoute was designed so that for each section of the route, the route distance is less than 10% over the shortest road distance between two points. The CircleRoute is a limited stops route, meaning it does not stop at every bus stop along its route.

The routes were renumbered from 98 and 99 to 998 and 999 on 31 January 2016, as to signify being a part of Transperth's premium, high-frequency services.

From April 2016 to March 2017, each direction of the CircleRoute had two million to three million yearly boardings, making the CircleRoute the second and third most used Transperth bus route, after the 950 bus route from Morley bus station to QEII Medical Centre.

Fares
Since 25 November 2007, fares have been determined according to the same Transperth zonal system used by other bus routes and trains in the region; prior to that date, the CircleRoute used its own distinct zones.

Route

Major bus stops

References

External links
Route 998 timetable Transperth
Route 999 timetable Transperth

Bus routes in Australia
Bus transport in Western Australia
Circular bus routes
Public transport in Perth, Western Australia
Bus transport brands